Frankenstein's Aunt Returns is a novel by Allan Rune Pettersson that was first published in Sweden in 1989. The book is a sequel to the first book Frankenstein's Aunt. The story is about Franklin (named after Benjamin Franklin), a child created by Doctor Frankenstein with the help of Doctor Pretorius for the monster and his bride. The child is inventive like his namesake and has a talent for practical jokes. This leads again to conflicts with the villagers, who are far from happy to have another monster in their midst.

See also

 Frankenstein's Aunt

Literature
 Allan Rune Pettersson: Frankenstein's Aunt Returns, 

1989 Swedish novels
Swedish fantasy novels
Frankenstein novels
Swedish-language novels